The Edward J. Roye Building is a wrecked skyscraper on Ashmun Street in the commercial district of Monrovia, the capital city of Liberia.  Constructed as the headquarters of the True Whig Party, it was renamed the "E.J. Roye Memorial Building" in 1964. It is one of the most prominent buildings in the city.  In the building's earlier years, it included a grand auditorium, and before the 1980 coup d'état, it hosted government meetings such as sessions of the Legislature in 1975, as well as non-governmental conventions such as the Liberian Federation of Trade Unions in 1977.  It sits in the heart of the city's pre-coup commercial district, near locations such as the former offices of the American Colonization Society.

Considering that the Party had become defunct following the 1980 coup, the General Services Agency appropriated the building in 2011, and in view of the building's ruined state, the building was closed for construction in late 2013.  The action provoked anger among the leaders of the rump TWP, who considered their party still to be the owners of the building and filed suit to have themselves declared the rightful owners and to have government officials enjoined from further possession of or construction at the property.

References

External links
Crowds at the Roye Building from the Indiana University Liberian Collections

Buildings and structures in Monrovia
Headquarters of political parties
Modern ruins
Skyscrapers in Africa